Segonzac may refer to the following places and people in France:

Places
Segonzac, Charente, a commune in the department of Charente
Segonzac, Corrèze, a commune in the department of Corrèze
Segonzac, Dordogne, a commune in the department of Dordogne

People
André Dunoyer de Segonzac (1884–1974), a French painter
René de Segonzac (1867-1962), French army officer and explorer